Yevheniya Yaroshynska (1868 – 1904) was a Ukrainian educator, writer and activist.

She was born in Bukovina province in Western Ukraine, at that time part of Austria-Hungary. Because German was the official language at the time, her first stories were written in German. After a Ukrainian newspaper was established in her region, she began to read Ukrainian authors and to study the local folklore. She wrote down the lyrics to 450 Bukovinian folk songs. In 1888, she began writing articles on Ukrainian culture for Ukrainian, German and Czech periodicals. Two years later, she began writing stories in Ukrainian and translating literature into Ukrainian. She studied to become a teacher and received her certificate in 1896. She also became involved in the women's movement in the Ukraine.

Yaroshynska contributed to the almanac Nasha dolya (Our fate), which was edited by Nataliya Kobrynska.

She took a weaving course and then taught peasant women this craft to allow them to generate more income for their households. She also formed reading clubs where she read newspapers to peasants to help keep them aware of current affairs.

Her work was translated to English for the collection But... The Lord is Silent (1999).

References 

1868 births
1904 deaths
Ukrainian women short story writers
Ukrainian short story writers
Ukrainian feminists
19th-century Ukrainian women writers
20th-century Ukrainian women writers 
19th-century Ukrainian writers
20th-century Ukrainian writers